The Rivière à la Tortue (English: Turtle River) flows east, in the municipalities of Hérouxville, Saint-Séverin (Mékinac) and Saint-Stanislas, in the MRC Mékinac Regional County Municipality and Les Chenaux Regional County Municipality, in Mauricie, in Quebec, in Canada.

Geography 
The "rivière à la Tortue" takes its source at the mouth of "Lac à la Tortue" (northern part of the lake which is located in Hérouxville). The southern part of this lake is located in the Lac-à-la-Tortue sector of Shawinigan.

From the "Lac à la Tortue", the river turns a priori towards the northeast. It subsequently crosses:
Tributary: Drouin and Brouillette watercourse (comprising the Adam-Cossette branch);
 rang Saint-Pierre (north-east) of Hérouxville for 2.4 km in a straight line (or 3.1 km following the course of the river), where the river makes a large curve to the right in heading southeast. Tributary: Bordeleau and Jacques watercourse;
 rang Saint-Paul (south-west side) Saint-Sévérin, on 4.6 km in a direct line (or 5.8 km following the course of the river). Tributaries: discharge from the Rang Saint-Pierre bay, Delfi and Ayotte rivers (including the Lafrance branch);
 rang Saint-Paul (northeast) in Saint-Sévérin, 1.9 km in a direct line (or 2.3 km following the course of the river). Tributary: Lépine stream.
 Saint-Louis concession (southwest), 1.2 km in a direct line (1.7 km following the course of the river), on lots 158–159.
 the southwest range of the Envies river in Saint-Stanislas, 2.8 km in a direct line (4 km following the route). Tributaries: Brûlé stream (lot 280) and Gignac stream (lot 288).

Finally, the river flows into the Rivière des Envies in Saint-Stanislas, near the current bridge of the route 159, at 3, 5 km from the mouth of the Envies river.

The Turtle River sub-basin is located between that of Rivière des Envies (to the northeast) and that of River des Chutes (to the southeast ). The distance in a direct line, between its source and its mouth, is 14 km (or 20.4 km following the course of the river).

Toponymy 
The toponym "Rivière à la Tortue" is directly associated with the name of head lake, ie "Lac à la Tortue". The toponym "Rivière à la Tortue" was registered on December 5, 1968 in the Bank of Place Names of Quebec of the Commission de toponymie du Québec.

See also 

 Hérouxville
 Saint-Sévérin
 Saint-Stanislas
 Lac-à-la-Tortue
 Rivière des Envies
 Batiscan River
 Batiscanie
 Mékinac Regional County Municipality
 Les Chenaux Regional County Municipality
 List of rivers of Quebec

Notes and references 

Rivers of Mauricie
Mékinac Regional County Municipality
Les Chenaux Regional County Municipality